Dmitri Alekseyevich Khlestov (born 21 January 1971) is a former Russian football player.

Club career
He played for FC Spartak Moscow, Beşiktaş J.K. (Turkey), FC Torpedo-Metallurg Moscow and FC Sokol Saratov.

After 2008 he played in some amateur teams.

International
He played for Russia national football team and was a participant at the 1994 FIFA World Cup. Khlestov is one of the two players (along with his former teammate Dmitri Ananko) who won the Russian League 9 times.

Honours
Russian Premier League winner in 1992, 1993, 1994, 1996, 1997, 1998, 1999, 2000
Russian Cup winner in 1992, 1994, 1998, 2003

References

External links
Profile at RussiaTeam 

1971 births
Footballers from Moscow
Living people
Soviet footballers
Russian footballers
Russia international footballers
Association football midfielders
Dual internationalists (football)
FC Spartak Moscow players
FC Moscow players
FC Sokol Saratov players
Beşiktaş J.K. footballers
FC Arsenal Tula players
1994 FIFA World Cup players
Soviet Top League players
Russian Premier League players
Süper Lig players
Russian expatriate footballers
Expatriate footballers in Turkey